Minuscule 557 (in the Gregory-Aland numbering), ε 356 (in the Soden numbering), is a Greek minuscule manuscript of the New Testament, on a parchment. Palaeographically it has been assigned to the 13th century. 
Scrivener labelled it by number 524.

Description 

The codex contains a complete text of the four Gospels on 183 parchment leaves (size ). The writing is in one column per page, 27 lines per page. It is beautifully written.

The style of writing closely resembles Minuscule 38.

Text 

According to Hermann von Soden it is associated with the Iota text-type. The Greek text of the codex Aland did not place in any Category.
According to the Claremont Profile Method in Luke 1 and 20 it belongs to the textual family Πa. In Luke 10 no profile was made.

History 

The manuscript was in the possession of Earl of Leicester at Holkham Hall until it was transferred to the Bodleian Library in 1981, by arrangement with H. M. Treasury and the executors of the 5th Earl of Leicester. It was added to the list of the New Testament manuscripts by Scrivener (as codex 524) and was examined by Dean Burgon.

The manuscripts was added to the list of the New Testament minuscule manuscripts by F. H. A. Scrivener (524) and C. R. Gregory (557).

The manuscript is now housed at the Bodleian Library (Holkham Gr. 114) in Oxford.

See also 

 List of New Testament minuscules
 Biblical manuscript
 Textual criticism

References

Further reading 

 

Greek New Testament minuscules
13th-century biblical manuscripts
Bodleian Library collection